Enteucha diplocosma is a moth of the family Nepticulidae. It was described by Edward Meyrick in 1921. It is known from Assam, India.

References

Nepticulidae
Endemic fauna of India
Leaf miners
Moths described in 1921
Moths of Asia
Taxa named by Edward Meyrick